Anand Sai is an art director in South Indian cinema. He received a state award by Tamil Nadu for his work in the movie New. Sai was born in Parlakhemundi Odisha; his father came to Madras in 1950 to be an art director in film industry.

Education
Sai studied interior design in Chennai and made a mark in event management for a while before getting into the film industry. Since then he has worked in over 50 movies. In his first movie he recreated the Taj Mahal on the seashore for Pawan Kalyan's Tholi Prema.

Career
Sai has worked on sets for movies such as Yamadonga, Sainikudu, Puli, Brindavanam, Naani, Gudumba Shanker, and Baalu. This has translated into wedding sets designed for leading business houses and stars of Telugu cinema.

All the sets he designs are constructed in accordance with vaastu as he feels more comfortable if they are done that way. He also suggests the lighting scheme for his sets and discusses with the cinematographer to enhance the quality of the output. He has also forayed into advertisements, with Pepsi, Amruthanjan, Fair and Lovely. He received a state award from Tamil Nadu for his incredible work in the movie New.

He is the chief architect for the Lakshmi Narasimha temple, Yadadri temple near Bhuvanagiri, Telangana. He has been working full time on the project since 2016. The designs comply with Agama Shastra.

Personal life 
Anand Sai is married to actress Vasuki Anand, who acted in a supporting role in Pawan Kalyan's movie 'Tholi Prema' as Pawan Kalyan's sister. After the marriage, Vasuki Anand stopped working in movies. She currently is working at Google. They have two children, a daughter, Harshitha Anand and a son, Sandeep Anand.

References

External links 
 
 *  https://www.youtube.com/user/anandsaiartdirector

Living people
Telugu people
Indian art directors
Year of birth missing (living people)